Cobaea scandens, the cup-and-saucer vine, cathedral bells, Mexican ivy, or monastery bells, is a species of flowering plant in the phlox family Polemoniaceae. It is native to Mexico, with isolated sightings elsewhere in tropical central and South America.

Description
It is a self-clinging perennial climber. The Latin specific epithet scandens means “climbing”. 
The  leaves comprise four leaflets and a tendril furnished with small hooks for clinging on to a support. The large forward-facing violet flowers, which are pollinated by bats in their native habitat, are bell-shaped with a pronounced ruff - hence the name “cup-and-saucer”. Mature flowers are scented. Present a capsular fruits with seeds.

Cultivation
In temperate regions it is best grown as a half-hardy annual, sown in heat under glass in early spring, and planted out after all danger of frost is past. It has gained the Royal Horticultural Society's Award of Garden Merit (confirmed 2017). A white form exists, C. scandens f. alba.

Darwin’s observations
Charles Darwin in 1875 made a detailed study of various climbing and twining plants, subjecting them to stimuli such as light and touch, and presenting them with a range of surfaces while minutely examining their movement over time. He was impressed by the exceptional strength and speed of Cobaea scandens:

References

External links

 Cobaea scandens
  Cobaea scandens

Polemoniaceae
Flora of Mexico
Vines
Taxa named by Antonio José Cavanilles